Helsinki Synagogue (Helsingin synagoga in Finnish, Helsingfors synagoga in Swedish) in the city of Helsinki (Helsingfors) is one of the two synagogues in Finland. Located in the Kamppi (Kampen) district, the synagogue is used by the 1,200-strong Jewish community of Helsinki. The synagogue building, designed by the Viipuri-born architect Jac. Ahrenberg (1847-1914), was completed in 1906.

Photos

References

See also 
Turku Synagogue
Vyborg Synagogue
Wikimedia Commons: Helsinki Synagogue, photo collection

Ashkenazi Jewish culture in Finland
Ashkenazi synagogues
Buildings and structures in Helsinki
Synagogues in Finland
Kamppi
Synagogue buildings with domes
Synagogues completed in 1906
1906 establishments in Finland